V, or v, is the twenty-second letter in the Latin alphabet, used in the modern English alphabet, the alphabets of other western European languages and others worldwide. Its name in English is vee (pronounced ), plural vees.

History

The letter V ultimately comes from the Phoenician letter waw by way of U. See U for details.

During the Late Middle Ages, two minuscule glyphs of U developed which were both used for sounds including  and modern . The pointed form "v" was written at the beginning of a word, while a rounded form "u" was used in the middle or end, regardless of sound. So whereas "valour" and "excuse" appeared as in modern printing, "have" and "upon" were printed as "haue" and "vpon". The first distinction between the letters "u" and "v" is recorded in a Gothic script from 1386, where "v" preceded "u". By the mid-16th century, the "v" form was used to represent the consonant and "u" the vowel sound, giving us the modern letter V. U and V were not accepted as distinct letters until many years later. The rounded variant became the modern-day version of U, and the letter's former pointed form became V.

Letter
In the International Phonetic Alphabet,  represents the voiced labiodental fricative. See Help:IPA.

In English, special rules of orthography normally apply to the letter V:

 Traditionally, V is not doubled to indicate a short vowel, the way, for example, P is doubled to indicate the difference between "super" and "supper".
 Words that ends in a [v] sound (except of) normally spell that sound -ve, regardless of the pronunciation of the vowel before it. This rule does not apply to transliterations of Slavic and Hebrew words, such as Kyiv (Kiev), or to words that started out as abbreviations, such as sov for sovereign.
 The short u sound is spelled o, not u, before the letter v. This originated with a mediaeval scribal practice designed to increase legibility by avoiding too many vertical strokes (minims) in a row.

Like J, K, Q, X, and Z; V is not used very frequently in English. It is the sixth least frequently used letter in the English language, with a frequency of about 1% in words. V is the only letter that cannot be used to form an English two-letter word in the British and Australian versions of the game of Scrabble. It is one of only two letters (the other is C) that cannot be used this way in the American version. V is also the only letter in the English language that is never silent.

The letter appears frequently in the Romance languages, where it is the first letter of the second person plural pronoun and (in Italian and Catalan) the stem of the imperfect form of most verbs.

Name in other languages
 
 
 
  or vu 
 
 
  is recommended, but ve  is traditional. If V is pronounced in the second way, it would have the same pronunciation as the letter B in Spanish (i.e.  after pause or nasal sound, otherwise ); thus further terms are needed to distinguish ve from be. In some countries it is called ve corta, ve baja, ve pequeña, ve chica or ve labiodental.

The phoneme  in Japanese is used properly only in loanwords, where the preference for either  or  depends on many factors; in general, words that are perceived to be in common use tend toward .

Pronunciation and use

In most languages which use the Latin alphabet,  has a voiced bilabial or labiodental sound. In English, it is a voiced labiodental fricative. In contemporary German, it is pronounced  in most loan-words while in native German words, it is always pronounced .

In Native American languages of North America (mainly Muskhogean and Iroquoian),  represents a nasalized central vowel, /ə̃/.

In Chinese Pinyin, while  is not used, the letter  is used by most input methods to enter letter , which most keyboards lack (Romanised Chinese is a popular method to enter Chinese text). Informal romanizations of Mandarin Chinese use V as a substitute for the close front rounded vowel /y/, properly written ü in pinyin and Wade–Giles.

In Irish, the letter  is mostly used in loanwords, such as veidhlín from English violin. For more information, see Irish phonology.

This letter is not used in the Polish alphabet, where  is spelled with the letter  instead, following the convention of German.

Other systems

Related characters

Descendants and related letters in the Latin alphabet
U u : Latin letter U, originally the same letter as V
W w : Latin letter W, descended from U
Ỽ ỽ : Middle Welsh V
V with diacritics: Ṽ ṽ Ṿ ṿ Ʋ ʋ ᶌ
IPA-specific symbols related to V:   
ᶹ : Modifier letter small v with hook is used in phonetic transcription
𐞰 : Modifier letter small v with right hook is a superscript IPA letter
Ʌ ʌ ᶺ: Turned v
ⱴ : V with curl
Uralic Phonetic Alphabet-specific symbols related to V:

Ancestors and siblings in other alphabets
𐤅: Semitic letter Waw, from which the following symbols originally derive
Υ υ : Greek letter Upsilon, from which V derives
Y y : Latin letter Y, which, like V, also derives from Upsilon (but was taken into the alphabet at a later date)
Ѵ ѵ : Cyrillic letter izhitsa, also descended from Upsilon
У у : Cyrillic letter u, also descended from Upsilon via the digraph of omicron and upsilon
 Ү ү : Cyrillic letter Ү, descended from У and izhitsa and used in the scripts for languages in the former Soviet Union and currently the Russian Federation, as well as in Mongolian. Most commonly it represents /y/ or /ʏ/.

Ligatures and abbreviations
℣ : Versicle sign
Ꝟ ꝟ : Forms of V were used for medieval scribal abbreviations

Computing codes

 1

Other representations
V is the symbol for vanadium. It is number 23 on the periodic table. Emerald derives its green coloring from either vanadium or chromium.

v, v., and vs can also be used as an abbreviation for the word versus when between two or more competing items (Ex: Brown v. Board of Education).

See also
V to mean the number 5, in Roman numerals
, in music theory
VEE (disambiguation)
∨, 
 (✓)
  (✌ or 🖔)

Notes

References

External links

ISO basic Latin letters